Tynwald, or more formally, the High Court of Tynwald or Tynwald Court, is the legislature of the Isle of Man. It consists of two chambers, known as the branches of Tynwald: the directly elected House of Keys and the indirectly chosen Legislative Council. When the two chambers sit together, they become "Tynwald Court".

The chambers sit jointly, on Tynwald Day at St John's for largely ceremonial purposes, and usually once a month in the Legislative Buildings in Douglas. Otherwise, the two chambers sit separately, with the House of Keys originating most legislation, and the Legislative Council acting as a revising chamber.

Etymology
The name Tynwald, like the Icelandic  and Norwegian Tingvoll, is derived from the Old Norse word  meaning the meeting place of the assembly, the field (vǫllr→wald, cf. the Old English cognate weald) of the thing.

Tynwald Day
Tynwald meets annually on Tynwald Day (usually on 5 July) at an open-air ceremony at Tynwald Hill at St John's. The Lieutenant Governor of the Isle of Man presides, unless the monarch as Lord of Mann, or a member of the Royal Family representing them, is present. Here, all laws are promulgated and petitions are received.

Promulgation
If an Act of Tynwald is not promulgated at St John's within 18 months of passage, it becomes null and void.

Joint sittings
When Tynwald sits in Douglas (historically once a month from October to July), the President of Tynwald, who is chosen by the other members, presides. In the joint session:
 Members of each house formally sign bills
 Notice of royal assent from the King is received
 Questions may be put to ministers
 Special resolutions authorising taxes are made
 Delegated legislation made by government departments may be approved or annulled
 Petitions may be presented
 Other important public business is conducted

Voting
When Tynwald votes at a joint sitting, each branch normally votes separately. If a majority of each branch approves, the motion is carried. If the Council vote ties, then the President of Tynwald casts the deciding vote in line with the majority vote of the Keys. However, if the Keys approves a motion but the Council disapproves, then the question can be put again at a different sitting. In this case, the vote is determined by a majority of all the members of Tynwald. If this occurs, the Keys, with its larger size, is likely to prevail.

However, in some cases Tynwald votes as one body even when there is no disagreement between the branches: e.g. when electing the Chief Minister or on a vote of no confidence in the Council of Ministers.

Passage of legislation
Normally, both branches of Tynwald must pass a bill before it goes to the sovereign or his representative the Lieutenant Governor, representing the King-in-Council, for royal assent. But if the Council rejects a bill or amends it against the Keys' wishes, the Keys has the power to repass the same bill; in this case the Council's approval is not required, and the bill is presented to the Lieutenant Governor for royal assent.

On some matters, the Royal Assent to Legislation (Isle of Man) Order 1981 requires the Lieutenant Governor to consult with and follow the advice of the Secretary of State for Justice of the United Kingdom.

History of Tynwald
Tynwald claims to be over 1,000 years old, and thus the "oldest continuous parliament" in the world. In 1979, the Manx people celebrated the millennium of their parliament. The year was picked arbitrarily by officials; there is no evidence indicating that such an assembly was held in 979, or that any such event resembled the modern-day court. In fact, the first record of the place-name occurs in the 13th–14th century Chronicle of Mann, and the first description of the role and composition of an assembly held on site occurs in the early 15th century.

Medieval period
Tynwald originally comprised only the 24 Members of the House of Keys, commonly referred to as "the Keys". There were four members for each of the six sheadings of the island. The earliest surviving record of the Keys dates from 1417. The Keys were not originally an elected body, and membership was for life. When a vacancy arose the remaining members selected the replacement member. In general, membership of the Keys passed down through the leading families on the island.

In the 16th century the Keys met irregularly. They were akin to a jury which was summoned from time to time by the Lord of Mann or by the deemsters when they required advice as to the law. In 1600 the Keys became a permanent body.

Until 1577, the Keys merely declared and interpreted the ancient common law when queries arose. This developed into the power to create new laws, a function that Tynwald adopted around 1610.

17th and 18th centuries
In October 1651, during the English Civil War, the island fell to the Parliamentary forces, who took over the administration of the government. During this period, Tynwald met only sporadically.

Following the restoration of the monarchy, control of the island was returned to the Lords of Mann. The Keys saw a reduction in their power at this point, as Tynwald was reconstituted as "the Lord [of Mann], the Governor, the principal officers and the deemsters (who constitute the Lord's Council), and the Commons represented by their Keys."

Administration of the government was vested in a Governor, and the Lords of Mann became absentee landlords. The Keys were unhappy with the changes, and agreed to very few new laws.

In 1737, Tynwald obtained further powers in addition to its monopoly on law-making: the agreement of Tynwald would be required for all taxation, in imitation of the constitutional practice of Great Britain. This was a short-lived arrangement, as in 1765 the Lord of Mann sold his rights over the island to the British Crown.

Post-revestment
Following the revestment of the Lordship of Mann into the British Crown in 1765, the British government assumed all powers to impose and collect taxes. Tynwald was left with no money to spend, and little power, although it was still able to bring about social change by the repeal in 1771 of restrictive labour legislation.

As a result, the Keys asked the British government to dissolve Tynwald and to assent to legislation for a new elected parliament, which they hoped would have a stronger voice to challenge the new government of the island, based in distant Whitehall. To this end, the Keys organised a petition of 800 signatures, which was presented to the British government.

A Royal Commission was appointed in 1791, but it was not until 1866 that Tynwald finally passed legislation that would see some of its members elected for the first time. However, before 1866 Tynwald's primary function had been that of the island's court of appeal. The House of Keys Election Act 1866 transferred this judicial power to a separate court.

Royal Commission on the Isle of Man
In 1791 a Royal Commission on the Isle of Man was formed to examine the governance and finances of the island.<ref>'The Land of Home Rule. Spencer Walpole, 1893</ref>

The Commissioners reported back to Whitehall in 1792, stating that "The laws and ordinances that were enacted during the fifteenth and sixteenth centuries appear by the Manks Statute Book to have been prescribed by such different powers, or combination of powers, that as precedents of the exercise of legislative authority they can have but little weight." The Commission noted that only subsequent to this period was the practice of the Council and 24 Keys meeting together to enact legislation established as "the more regular mode of legislating".

The Royal Commission also noted that the earliest insular Manx laws on record dated from 1417 (the first Act on record being a restriction of the powers of the church to offer sanctuary). This was after the arrival of the Stanley family as Lords of Mann. It also noted that the comprehensive Manx Statute Book dated from the year 1422 onwards. These were not necessarily the earliest laws passed, but any prior to this date were not recorded as Acts of Tynwald. Comparison can be made with other parliaments in the British Isles of a similar period: the oldest recorded in England was from 1229, in Scotland 1424, and in Ireland 1216 – although again there were prior laws that are now merely part of the unwritten common law of each country.

The opening statement of the Statute Book was "Divers Ordinances, Statutes, and Customs, presented, reputed, and used for Laws in the Land of Mann, that were ratified, approved, and confirmed, as well by the Honourable Sir John Stanley, Knight, King and Lord of the same Land, and divers others his Predecessors, as by all Barons, Deemsters, Officers, Tenants, Inhabitants, and Commons of the same Land where the Lord's Right is declared in the following Words". Furthermore, the Commissioners' report noted that prior to the revestment, no "minutes or journals" of the proceedings of the Council or the House of Keys had been kept.

Proposed changes
In 2007, the island's system of government was reviewed with plans to transform the Legislative Council into a directly elected chamber, echoing the push for reform in the UK's House of Lords. As of February 2021, no such legislation has passed through the House of Keys or House of Commons.

Millennium Way
The Millennium Way long distance footpath was opened in 1979 to commemorate the millennium year of Tynwald.

See also

 Act of Tynwald
 List of Acts of Tynwald

References

Sources
 Broderick, George (2003): "Tynwald - a Manx cult-site and institution of pre-Scandinavian origin?" Cambrian Medieval Celtic Studies'', no. 46 (Winter 2003): pp. 55–94.

External links

 

 
Thing (assembly)
979 establishments
Man, Isle of
Isle of Man